Harold William "Buddy" Pritchard (born January 25, 1936) is an American former professional baseball player and manager. A shortstop and second baseman, he was signed by the Pittsburgh Pirates as a $30,000 "bonus baby" after college baseball stardom at the University of Southern California, but the Bonus Rule then in effect in Major League Baseball kept him on the Pirate roster for his entire rookie season, 1957. Pritchard appeared in only 23 games, with 11 at bats and one hit, a single, for an .091 batting average. Pritchard's lone safety came on May 28 against Don Newcombe of the Brooklyn Dodgers at Forbes Field; it would be his only hit and his only year in the Major Leagues.

Pritchard was born in South Gate, California. He had been a batting star for the USC Trojans — batting .385 in 1956 to lead the team and being named a third team All-American and a member of the All-Pacific Coast and California Collegiate Baseball Association all-star teams. The Pirates outbid 11 of the other 16 Major League teams then in existence for his services.

But the inactivity forced by the Bonus Rule may have damaged Pritchard's chances of becoming a Major League star, or everyday player. He was sent to minor league baseball in 1958, and played eight seasons in the Pirate farm system, batting .256, then managed Rookie-level affiliates in the Pittsburgh minor-league organization through the late 1960s. He later scouted for the Pirates, Chicago Cubs and the Major League Scouting Bureau.

See also
List of baseball players who went directly to Major League Baseball

References

External links
Major League statistics from Baseball Reference

1936 births
Living people
Asheville Tourists players
Baseball players from California
Chicago Cubs scouts
Columbus Jets players
Lincoln Chiefs players
Major League Baseball scouts
Major League Baseball shortstops
People from South Gate, California
Pittsburgh Pirates players
Pittsburgh Pirates scouts
Salt Lake City Bees players
Savannah Pirates players
Sportspeople from Los Angeles County, California
USC Trojans baseball players